Dahyat is a village in Satara district in the Indian state of Maharashtra.It is situated on the banks of the River Krishna.It is about 21 km from Wai, Maharashtra.

Demographics
As of 2011 India census, Dahyat had a population of 541 in 120 households. Male and female both constitutes 50% of the population. Dahyat has an average literacy rate of 69%, lower than the national average of 74%: male literacy is 57.7%, and female literacy is 42.2%. In Dahyat, 9.6% of the population is under 6 years of age.

Temples

There are 3 major temples in Dahyat:

 Ram Mandir
 Janni Deul
 Bhairoba Mandir
 Mariaai Deul

Special Highlights

 River Krishna
 Kamalgad
 Gothmi hill
 Vetal hill

Gallery

References

http://www.censusindia.gov.in/pca/final_pca.aspx

Villages in Satara district